Greg Boykin (born December 8, 1953) is a retired NFL running back. He was born in Ravenna, Ohio, and grew up in neighboring Kent, where he attended Theodore Roosevelt High School. Boykin played college football for the Northwestern Wildcats and was later drafted by the New Orleans Saints with the 174th selection in the 1977 NFL Draft.

Boykin has also played with the San Francisco 49ers (1978).

Boykin now teaches Auto Tech at Max S. Hayes High School

References

External links
FanBase
Pro Football Reference

Living people
1953 births
New Orleans Saints players
San Francisco 49ers players
Northwestern Wildcats football players
Sportspeople from Kent, Ohio
People from Ravenna, Ohio
American football running backs
Players of American football from Ohio